Graham K. Burgess (born 24 February 1968 in Liverpool, England) is an English FIDE Master of chess and a noted writer and trainer.  He became a FIDE Master at the age of twenty.  He attended Birkdale High School in Southport, Merseyside.  In 1989 he graduated from the University of Cambridge with a degree in mathematics.  In 1994 he set a world record by playing 510 games of blitz chess (five minutes for each player) in three days, winning 431 games and drawing 25 .

Burgess has written more than twenty books and edited more than 250.  His book The Mammoth Book of Chess won the British Chess Federation Book of the Year Award in 1997.  He is the editorial director of Gambit Publications. .

He is also a Doom (1993) speedrunner.

Books

 
 

 
 First edition (1997) also published in hardback as Chess: Tactics and Strategy, Castle Books, 2002,

References

External links
 
 
 

1968 births
Living people
English chess players
British chess writers
British sportswriters
Chess FIDE Masters